The flat pebblesnail (Lepyrium showalteri) is a species of freshwater snail, an aquatic gastropod mollusk in the family Lithoglyphidae.

This species is endemic to the United States. This snail has been listed as endangered on the United States Fish and Wildlife Service list of endangered species since October 28, 1998.

Lepyrium showalteri is the only species in the genus Lepyrium. Lepyrium showalteri is the type species of the genus Lepyrium. Lepyriidae is a synonym of Lithoglyphinae.

Description 
The flat pebblesnail is a small snail in the family Lithoglyphidae; however, the species has a large and distinctive-looking shell. This snail's shell is also distinguished by its depressed spire and expanded, flattened body whorl. The shells are ovate in outline, flattened, and grow to 3.5 to 4.4 mm (0.1 to 0.2 in) high and 4 to 5 mm (0.2 in) wide. The umbilical area is imperforate (no opening), and there are 2 to 3 whorls which rapidly expand.

The anatomy of this species was described in detail by Thompson in 1984.

Original description 
Species Lepyrium showalteri was originally described as Neritina showalteri by Isaac Lea in 1861.

Lea's original text (the type description) reads as follows:

Distribution 
This species is endemic to Alabama in the United States. It was historically known from:
 the mainstem Coosa River in Shelby County and Talladega County, Alabama;
 the Cahaba River in Bibb and Dallas County, Alabama;
 and the Little Cahaba River in Bibb County, Alabama.

The flat pebblesnail has not been found in the Coosa River portion of its range since the construction of the Lay Dam and Logan Martin Dam, and recent survey efforts have failed to locate any surviving populations outside of the Cahaba River drainage.

The flat pebblesnail is currently known from one site on the Little Cahaba River, Bibb County, and from a single shoal series on the Cahaba River above the Fall Line, Shelby County, Alabama.

Ecology 
Little is known of the natural history of this species. The flat pebblesnail is found attached to clean, smooth stones in rapid currents of river shoals. The eggs are laid in capsules on hard surfaces. The life span appears to be 1 year.

References 
This article incorporates public domain text from the reference and a public domain work of the United States Government from the reference

External links 
Tryon G. W. (1888-1889) Manual of Conchology, structural and systematic, with illustrations of the species. 10: 53, plate 17, figure 81-82.

Gastropods described in 1861
Endemic fauna of Alabama
Lithoglyphidae
Taxonomy articles created by Polbot
ESA endangered species